St. Augustine Academy is a private, independently operated Roman Catholic school situated in Ventura, California.  It is located within the Roman Catholic Archdiocese of Los Angeles The school's patron Saint is Augustine of Hippo. The school offers a classical liberal arts curriculum.   The liberal arts are divided into the trivium consisting of grammar, logic and rhetoric, and the quadrivium consisting of arithmetic, geometry, music and astronomy. The school is accredited with the Western Association of Schools and Colleges, WASC, as well as the Western Catholic Educational Association, WCEA.

Background
The school was founded in 1994 by Roy Rohter, after a meeting of Catholic parents who wanted a school where their children could receive a classical liberal arts education that would also focus on assisting their efforts to teach their children about their Catholic faith.

School
The faculty is 27% male and 73% female with an average of 8 years at the school. 68% have a graduate degree.

91% of St. Augustine graduates go on to college or university.

St. Augustine's is on the Catholic Education Honor Roll  and was also named to it in 2007, 2008, 2010, 2012, and 2014.

High school students averaged 54 hours of volunteer service to the community in 2014. Total cumulative service hours totaled over 3,426.

St. Augustine's has no athletics program; some students are eligible to play sports at other schools in their district of residence via multi-school agreements.

External links
 School Website
 Facebook

Notes and references

Catholic secondary schools in California
Educational institutions established in 1994
Buildings and structures in Ventura, California
High schools in Ventura County, California
Catholic elementary schools in California
1994 establishments in California